Kruzy may refer to the following places in Poland:
 Kruzy, Podlaskie Voivodeship
 Kruzy, Warmian-Masurian Voivodeship